The 1976 TAA Formula Ford Driver to Europe Series was an Australian motor racing competition open to Formula Ford racing cars. It was the seventh Australian national series for Formula Fords. The series was won by Richard Carter driving a Birrana F73.

Series schedule
The series was contested over eight rounds.

Series results

 All cars were powered by mandatory 1600cc Ford pushrod engines.
 Only seven drivers were awarded points at Round 6 for reasons unknown.

References

TAA
Australian Formula Ford Series